Kazakhstan participated in the 1994 Asian Games from October 2 to October 16, 1994 in Hiroshima, Japan, which was the country's first appearance at the Asian Games since gaining independence.

References

Nations at the 1994 Asian Games
1994
Asian Games